Ellis Tinios is a book historian at the University of Leeds.

Tinios is a specialist in the evolution of the illustrated book in Japan from 1615 to 1912, and the representation of China in Japanese books and prints of the 18th and 19th centuries.

Selected publications
     Understanding Japanese woodblock-printed illustrated books: a short introduction to their history, bibliography and format, co-authored with Suzuki Jun (National Institute of Japanese Literature, Tokyo). Leiden: Brill, 2013.
     ‘Japanese illustrated erotic books in the context of commercial publishing, 1660-1868’ in Japan Review No. 26 (2013) Special Issue: Shunga: Sex and humour in Japanese art and Literature. Edited by Andrew Gerstle. pp. 83–96.
     Contributor to the exhibition catalogue Shunga: sex and pleasure in Japanese Art. Edited by Timothy Clark et al. British Museum Press, 2013.
     Japanese Prints: Ukiyo-e in Edo, 1700–1900. British Museum Press, 2010.
     ‘Pushing the Boundaries: Kuniyoshi and China’ in Impressions: The Journal of the Japanese Art Society of America, Inc., Number 31 (2010)
     ‘Art, anatomy and eroticism: The Human Body in Japanese Illustrated Books of the Edo Period, 1615-1868’. East Asian Science, Technology, and Medicine. Number 31 (2010), pp. 44–63.
     ‘’ 円山四条派画譜の目的 ("The Purpose of Maruyama-Shijô School ") in  江戸の絵本：画像とテキストの綾なせる世界 (Ehon in the Edo Period: a splendid world of interwoven image and text) (2010).
     ‘Once, twice, thrice-wrong’ [review article on the third edition of Christopher Hitchens. The Parthenon Marbles: the Case for Reunification] in Art Watch UK Newsletter No.25 (Autumn 2009)
     ‘Warrior Prints: a Double-edged Sword’, essay in Competition and Collaboration: The Utagawa School and Japan's Print Culture edited by Laura Mueller. Chazen Museum of Art, University of Wisconsin-Madison. November 2007.                                                                 
     ‘The Fragrance of Female Immortals: Celebrity Endorsement from the Afterlife’ in Impressions: The Journal of the Ukiyo-e Society of America, Inc. Number 27 (2005-2006), pp. 43–53.

References 

Living people
Academics of the University of Leeds
Japanese books
Japanese art
Year of birth missing (living people)
Historians of printing